Yaadgar is a 1970 Hindi film produced and directed by S. Ram Sharma. The film stars Manoj Kumar, Nutan, Pran, Prem Chopra, Madan Puri, Kamini Kaushal and Rajnath as a villager. The music is by Kalyanji Anandji. This film has some very memorable songs.

Cast 
 Manoj Kumar
 Nutan
 Pran
 Prem Chopra
 Madan Puri
 Kamini Kaushal 
 Rajnath

Soundtrack

External links 
 

1970 films
1970s Hindi-language films
Films scored by Kalyanji Anandji